Richard Handcock, 3rd Baron Castlemaine (17 November 1791 – 4 July 1869) was an Irish peer and Tory politician.

Background and education
Castlemaine was the eldest son of Richard Handcock, 2nd Baron Castlemaine, and Anne, daughter of Arthur French. He was educated at Trinity College, Cambridge.

Political career
Castlemaine was returned to Parliament for Athlone in 1826, a seat he held until 1832. He succeeded his father in the barony in 1840 and was elected an   Irish Representative Peer in 1841.

Family
Lord Castlemaine married Margaret, daughter of Michael Harris, in 1822. They had two sons and two daughters. She died in January 1867. Lord Castlemaine survived her by two years and died in July 1869, aged 77. He was succeeded in the barony by his eldest son, Richard.

Arms

References

1791 births
1869 deaths
Alumni of Trinity College, Cambridge
Richard 3
Irish representative peers
Members of the Parliament of the United Kingdom for Athlone
UK MPs 1826–1830
UK MPs 1830–1831
UK MPs 1831–1832
UK MPs who inherited peerages
Tory MPs (pre-1834)